Hollis Thomas, Jr. (born January 10, 1974) is a former American football defensive tackle. He was signed by the Philadelphia Eagles as an undrafted free agent in 1996. He played college football at Northern Illinois.

Thomas also played for the New Orleans Saints and Carolina Panthers.

Professional career

Philadelphia Eagles
In 1996, Thomas went undrafted. He signed a deal with the Philadelphia Eagles as an undrafted free agent. In his 10-year career with the Eagles he became a major part of their defense. After the Eagles drafted a young defensive tackle in Broderick Bunkley, the Eagles cut Thomas.

New Orleans Saints
Right after Thomas was cut by the Philadelphia Eagles, the Saints claimed him from the waivers. When healthy, Thomas was considered an important part of the Saints' defense, especially against running plays, and he was seen as playing a key role in the Saints' successful 2006 season, when they reached the NFC championship game for the first time in their history.

On December 5, 2006 Thomas was suspended for four games by the NFL for violating the league's steroids policy.  In Thomas' appeal, New Orleans team doctor John Amos said that Thomas' asthma medicine contained two steroids, creating a false positive.  Thomas lost the appeal.

Thomas tore his right triceps on August 14, 2008 in a pass-rushing drill against a Houston Texans offensive lineman.  He was later released on September 11 with an injury settlement.  The Saints re-signed him on November 3.

On April 29, 2009 it was reported that the Saints had released Thomas.

St. Louis Rams
On July 29, 2009 the St. Louis Rams signed Thomas. He was given a 1-year deal for an undisclosed amount.

Carolina Panthers
Thomas was signed by the Carolina Panthers on October 1, 2009 after the team waived defensive tackle Ra'Shon Harris. In a game against the Buffalo Bills on October 25, 2009, Thomas tackled Bills running back Fred Jackson in the end-zone for a safety.

References

External links
Carolina Panthers bio

1974 births
Living people
Sportspeople from Abilene, Texas
Players of American football from Texas
American football defensive tackles
Northern Illinois Huskies football players
Philadelphia Eagles players
New Orleans Saints players
St. Louis Rams players
Carolina Panthers players
Omaha Nighthawks players
Philadelphia Soul coaches